Ali İhsan Su (born 25 June 1959) is a Turkish bureaucrat who has served as the 12th Governor of Şırnak since February 2015, having been appointed by President Recep Tayyip Erdoğan on the recommendation of the Turkish Government. He previously served as the 8th Governor of Düzce from 2013 to 2015, having been appointed by former President Abdullah Gül. He is a former Kaymakam (Sub-Governor of a district).

Early life
Born in 1959 in Konya, Su was educated at Istanbul University Faculty of Political Science and graduated in 1985. He began working at the Central Administration as a Kaymakam candidate.

Bureaucratic career
Su served as the Kaymakam for the district of Evren, Ankara in Ankara Province, Çermik in Diyarbakır Province, Çay, Afyonkarahisar in Afyonkarahisar Province, Söğüt in Bilecik Province, Terme in Samsun Province and İskenderun, Hatay Province. He also served as Deputy Governor of Hakkâri.

In 2013, he was appointed as the 8th Governor of Düzce after President Abdullah Gül approved his nomination by the Turkish Government. After serving for two years, he was re-assigned as the 12th Governor of Şırnak.

See also
Governor (Turkey)
List of Turkish civil servants
Ministry of the Interior (Turkey)

References

External links
Website of the Governor of Düzce
Website of the Governor of Şırnak

Governors of Düzce
Governors of Şırnak
Living people
People from Konya
1959 births
Turkish civil servants